Marlar is a surname. Notable people with the surname include:

Henry Marlar, 15th-century English politician
Mike Marlar (born 1978), American professional dirt track and stock car racing driver
Robin Marlar (born 1931), English cricketer and cricket journalist